Soumitro Banerjee (born 1960) is an Indian electrical engineer and a professor at the Department of Physical Sciences of the Indian Institute of Science Education and Research, Kolkata. He is known for his studies on bifurcation phenomena in power electronic circuits and is an elected fellow of all three major Indian science academies: the National Academy of Sciences, India, Indian Academy of Sciences, and Indian National Science Academy. He is also a fellow of The World Academy of Sciences, Institute of Electrical and Electronics Engineers, West Bengal Academy of Sciences and the Indian National Academy of Engineering. The Council of Scientific and Industrial Research, the apex agency of the Government of India for scientific research, awarded him the Shanti Swarup Bhatnagar Prize for Science and Technology, one of the highest Indian science awards for his contributions to Engineering Sciences in 2003.

Biography 

Soumitro Banerjee, born on 17 October 1960 at Kolkata in the Indian state of West Bengal, did his graduate studies at Bengal Engineering College of the University of Calcutta from where he earned a BE degree in electrical engineering in 1981 and moved to the Indian Institute of Technology, Delhi to gain an MTech in Energy Studies in 1983. After enrolling for PhD at IIT Delhi, he took up the post of a lecturer at the Indian Institute of Technology, Kharagpur in 1985 and while serving there he received his doctoral degree in 1988 for his thesis, Magnetic Energy Storage Units for Improvement of Power System Stability. He served IIT Kharagpur till 2009 during which period held the positions of an assistant professor (1990–98), associate professor (1998–2003) and a professor. In 2009, he moved to the Indian Institute of Science Education and Research, Kolkata where he serves as a professor.

Legacy 

Banerjee's researches have been focused on nonlinear dynamics and bifurcation theory and his experiments and analyses widened the understanding of border collision bifurcations. He worked on hybrid dynamical systems such as switching electronic circuits and mechanical systems showing impacts or stick-slip phenomenon and demonstrated border-collision bifurcation, a mode of dynamical transition, occurring in those systems. He developed a mathematical theory for elucidating these bifurcations and his studies are known to be in use in various applications. He has also worked extensively on nonlinear phenomena in power electronics. He has documented his researches by way of several articles; Google Scholar and ResearchGate, online article repositories of scientific articles, have listed many of them. Besides, he has made several presentations and has authored two books, Dynamics for Engineers, which details modelling and analysis of dynamical systems, and Wind Electrical Systems, the first Indian book on wind energy conversion. He has also edited a book, Nonlinear Phenomena in Power Electronics: Bifurcations, Chaos, Control, and Applications, in which he has written a number of chapters.

Banerjee was associated with three journals of the Institute of Electrical and Electronics Engineers; he served as the associate editor of IEEE Transactions on Circuits and Systems II (2003–05) and of the IEEE Transactions on Circuits and Systems (2006–07) and is the associate editor of IEEE Circuits & Systems Society Newsletter since 2010. His efforts have been reported in the initiation of the National Conference on Nonlinear Systems and Dynamics (NCNSD) and he served as the convenor of the inaugural conference held at IIT Kharagpur campus in December 2003. he has also presented a number of papers at various editions of the conference. He is the general secretary of Breakthrough Science Society, a non-governmental organization for the popularization of science and sits in the editorial board of its journal. He is also the editor of Prakriti, a Bengali language science magazine. He has sat in the Sectional Committees on Electrical Engineering of such science academies as Indian National Academy of Engineering (2005–07 and 2013–15), Indian National Science Academy (2012–14) and Indian Academy of Sciences (2010–12. He has also been associated with several government agencies which included the Engineering Sciences Research Committee of the Council of Scientific and Industrial Research, Programme Advisory Committee in Electrical, Electronic and Computer Engineering of the Department of Science and Technology (DST) as well as the Board of Members of West Bengal Renewable Energy Development Agency (WBREDA) and he is a member of the Screening Committee on Engineering for Inspire Faculty Award of the DST.

Awards and honors 
Banerjee received the Boyscast Fellowship of the Department of Science and Technology in 1996 which enabled him to carry out collaborative research at the University of Maryland. The Council of Scientific and Industrial Research awarded him the Shanti Swarup Bhatnagar Prize, one of the highest Indian science awards in 2003. The next year, Thomson Scientific included him in the list of top 250 scientists in the world with the highest citation count in the Engineering category and awarded him the 2004 Citation Laureate Award. The same year, the Indian National Academy of Engineering elected him as a fellow and he became a fellow of the Indian Academy of Sciences  and the Indian National Science Academy in 2005 and 2007 respectively. He featured in the 2011 fellowship list of the West Bengal Academy of Science and Technology and the elected fellowship of The World Academy of Sciences reached him in 2012, followed by fellowships of the Institute of Electrical and Electronics Engineers in 2013 and the National Academy of Sciences, India in 2014. The Department of Science and Technology selected him for the J. C. Bose National fellowship in 2015.

Selected work

Books

Articles

Presentations

Outreach 
 Bringing Science to People, The Room of Lives Podcast

See also 

 Newton's method
 Lagrange multiplier
 Hamiltonian path problem
 Paul Glendinning

Notes

References

External links 
 

Recipients of the Shanti Swarup Bhatnagar Award in Engineering Science
1960 births
People from Nadia district
University of Calcutta alumni
IIT Delhi alumni
Academic staff of IIT Kharagpur
Indian electrical engineers
Fellows of the Indian Academy of Sciences
Fellows of the Indian National Science Academy
Fellows of The National Academy of Sciences, India
TWAS fellows
Fellow Members of the IEEE
Living people
Fellows of the Indian National Academy of Engineering
Indian scientific authors
Scientists from Kolkata